Robin E. Haak (born. 1986) is a German political scientist, tech entrepreneur and investor from Hanover, Germany.

Early life and career 
Robin Eric Haak was born in Hanover, Germany and was graduated from Gymnasium in Hanover. Haak studied political science, law and economics at the University of Salzburg. He later studied media management at Hamburg Media School, as well as University of Hamburg and graduated with an MBA degree. Haak started his career at Versace in New York. Later, he was employed by Axel Springer SE in Berlin. where he worked for the Axel Springer Digital Ventures, and co-founded the Axel Springer Plug and Play Accelerator. With this company, he acted as the first investor in the Fintech company N26.

After leaving Springer, Haak worked as a Co-Founder and Managing Director at Jobspotting GmbH; the company merged with Smartrecruiters Inc., where he became Shareholder as well as Managing Director; the company later reached unicorn status. Haak holds a stake in the company Woman Inc. UG and founded the company as Chief Marketing Officer.

He is also shareholder and board member of other companies. He co-created and built up Revaia, a German and France based Growth Equity Fund, with Environment Social Governance focus, and a crossover investment strategy (public and private investing), with a first fund size of 250 million €. January 2021, he joined the advisory board of Stepstone.

See also 
 Axel Springer SE
 Mathias Döpfner

References 

Living people
German political scientists
German business executives
Axel Springer SE
University of Hamburg alumni
German company founders
University of Salzburg alumni
1986 births